Murindó is a town and municipality in the Colombian department of Antioquia.

Climate
Murindó has a tropical rainforest climate (Af) with heavy to very heavy rainfall year-round.

Municipalities of Antioquia Department